Diego Duque de Estrada (August 15, 1589 in Toledo, Spain1647?) was a Spanish memoir writer, soldier and adventurer.

He was the son of Juan Duque de Estrada, also a soldier of rank. He was orphaned very young, and educated by a cousin. While still young (a minor?) he was betrothed to his cousin's daughter. One night he found an intruder in the house, a gentleman with whom he was acquainted, and in a fit of jealousy killed both him and the young lady. The prevailing code of honor was considered a sufficient justification for Estrada's violence, but the law looked upon the act as a vulgar assassination, and he had to flee.

After leading a vagabond life in the south of Spain, he was arrested at Ecija, was brought to Toledo, and tortured with extreme ferocity in order to extort a general confession as to his life during the past months. He had the strength not to yield to pain, and was finally able to escape from prison, partly by the help of a nun in a religious house, which faced the prison and partly by the intervention of friends. He made his way to Naples, where he entered the service of the Duke of Osuna, at that time viceroy.

Duque de Estrada saw a good deal of fighting both with the Turks and the Venetians; he was employed by the viceroy in the conspiracy against Venice as one of the disguised Spanish soldiers, sent into the town to destroy the arsenal but who were warned in time that the conspiracy had been betrayed, and therefore escaped. After the fall of his patron, Duque de Estrada resumed his vagabond life, served under Bethlen Gabor in Transylvania, and in the Thirty Years' War. 

In 1633, he entered the order of San Juan de Dios, and died at some time after 1637 (1647?) in Sardinia, where he is known to have taken part in the defence of the island against an attack by the French.

He left a book of memoirs, entitled Comentarios de el desengenado de Si Mismo prueba de todos estados, y eleccíon del Mejor de ellos ("The Commentaries of one who knew his own little worth, the touchtstone of all the state of man, and the choice of the best"). They were written at different times, and parts have been lost. His style is inaccurate and inexact, and it would be unsafe to trust his memoirs in every detail, but they are amazingly vivid, and contain a wonderful picture of the moral and intellectual state of a large part of Spanish society at the time. The memoirs were reprinted by Don Pascual de Gayangos in the Memorial Histórico Español, vol. xii. (Madrid, 1860).

References

1589 births
1640s deaths
Spanish military personnel
Spanish male writers